Powo may refer to:

 Kingdom of Powo, a former Tibetan kingdom
 Plants of the World Online, a botanical database